Federal Government College, Minna is a Co-educational Federal Government own secondary College in Minna, Niger State and it is one among the Federal Unity Schools. It is located in a popular environment referred to as Chanchaga.

It was built and started it activities in January 1979 at a temporary place known now as Government Teachers College. The school is well known for its high level of academic excellence in their students as well as the teachers.

Notes 

Secondary schools in Nigeria
Educational institutions established in 1979
1979 establishments in Nigeria
Education in Niger State
Government schools in Nigeria